Ralph Louis Cohen (born 1952) is an American mathematician, specializing in algebraic topology and differential topology.

Career
Cohen received his bachelor's degree from the University of Michigan in 1973 and his Ph.D. in 1978 from Brandeis University where he worked under the supervision of Edgar H. Brown, Jr.  His thesis was titled On Odd Primary Stable Homotopy Theory.  He did his postdoctoral training as an L.E. Dickson Instructor at the University Chicago, and then became an Assistant Professor of Mathematics at Stanford University in 1980.  In 1983, he became an Associate Professor and was promoted to Full Professor in 1987.  Cohen is now the Barbara Kimball Browning Professor of Mathematics at Stanford. He was Chair of the Mathematics Department from 1992 to 1995, from 1999 to 2009 he was the Director of the Mathematics Research Center at Stanford, and from 2010 to 2016 was the Senior Associate Dean for the Natural Sciences in the School of Humanities and Sciences.

Cohen has been a visiting professor at Princeton University, the University of Oxford, the University of Cambridge, Paris Diderot University, Paris 13 University, the University of Lille, and the University of Copenhagen. He was a founding editor of both the Journal of Topology and Geometry & Topology.

Cohen has been the Ph.D. supervisor to over 30 doctoral students, including Ulrike Tillmann and Ernesto Lupercio.

Research
In 1991, Cohen, together with Frederick Cohen, Benjamin Mann, and R. James Milgram gave a complete description of the algebraic topology of the space of rational functions, and in the following years he made several contributions to the study of related moduli spaces. In 1995 Cohen, John D. S. Jones, and Graeme Segal introduced an approach for understanding the homotopy theory underlying Floer homology theory in Symplectic geometry. Since 2002 Cohen has been one of the developers and contributors to the theory of String topology, which was introduced originally by Moira Chas and Dennis Sullivan.

In 1995, Cohen was a founder of the Stanford University Math Camp (SUMaC), a summer camp for mathematically talented high school students. In 2002 Cohen received the Distinguished Teaching Award from Stanford University, and in 2005 he became a Bass Fellow in Undergraduate Education at Stanford.

Awards
In 1982 Cohen was a Sloan Research Fellow. In 1983 he was an invited speaker at the International Congress of Mathematicians in Warsaw. In 1984 he received the Presidential Young Investigator Award.  In 1988 he received an NSF International Award, in 2010 he served on the Executive Committee of the American Mathematical Society, and in 2012 he was elected a Fellow of the American Mathematical Society.

Selected publications
 
 
 
 
 
 A homotopy theoretic realization  of string topology,  (with   John D.S Jones)  Mathematische Annalen,  vol. 324,  773-798 (2002)
 
 with Kathryn Hess, Alexander A. Voronov: String Topology and Cyclic Homology, Birkhäuser 2006
 with Gunnar Carlsson: The What, Where and Why of Mathematics. A handbook for Teachers. 1991.
 with Gunnar Carlsson: Topics in Algebra. 1999.

References

External links

1952 births
Living people
20th-century American mathematicians
21st-century American mathematicians
Fellows of the American Mathematical Society
Topologists
University of Michigan alumni
Brandeis University alumni
Stanford University faculty
Sloan Research Fellows
Place of birth missing (living people)